Dolly Ahluwalia is an Indian actress and costume designer who was awarded the Sangeet Natak Akademi Award in 2001 for costume design. She has won 3 Filmfare Awards and three National Film Awards, two Best Costume Design awards for Bandit Queen (1993) and Haider (2014), and then as Best Supporting Actress for Vicky Donor (2012), which is also her best known role as an actress.

Career
She is alumni of National School of Drama graduating in 1979. Ahluwalia started her career by designing costumes for theatre. Thereafter she started film career with Shekhar Kapur's Bandit Queen in 1993, which got her first National Film Award for Best Costume Design.  Thereafter she designed for notable directors like Vishal Bhardwaj in The Blue Umbrella (2005), Omkara (2006), Blood Brothers (2007), Kaminey (2009) and Haider (2014),  with Deepa Mehta in Water (2005) and Midnight's Children (2012). Besides working with mainstream Bollywood films like Love Aaj Kal (2009), Luv Shuv Tey Chicken Khurana (2012) and with Rakeysh Omprakash Mehra in Bhaag Milkha Bhaag (2013).

Filmography

Costume designer

Actress

Awards and nominations

References

External links
 
 

Indian costume designers
Indian film actresses
Indian television actresses
Year of birth missing (living people)
Recipients of the Sangeet Natak Akademi Award
Living people
Filmfare Awards winners
Screen Awards winners
Place of birth missing (living people)
Actresses in Hindi cinema
Actresses in Punjabi cinema
National School of Drama alumni
21st-century Indian actresses
Indian Sikhs
20th-century Indian designers
21st-century Indian designers
20th-century Indian actresses
Best Supporting Actress National Film Award winners
Best Costume Design National Film Award winners
Ahluwalia